Kim Parker may refer to:

 Kim Parker (character), a fictional character played by Countess Vaughn in Moesha and The Parkers
 Kim Parker (actress) (1932–2010), Austrian-born actress in British films, best known for Fiend Without a Face